Athrips mouffetella is a moth of the family Gelechiidae. It is found from central and northern Europe to the Ural Mountains, Siberia and the Russian Far East. It has also been recorded from North America.

The wingspan is about 15 mm. The forewings are light ashy brown, irrorated with paler, faintly rosy-tinged ; some minute black dots near base and on termen ; stigmata and a dot obliquely beneath and before second discal black, first discal beyond plical. Hindwings are grey.
The larva is blackish-grey ; dorsal line whitish on incisions between 2 and 4; spiracular indistinct, whitish, clearer anteriorly; head and plate of 2 black.
The moths are on wing from June to August depending on the location.

The larvae feed on Lonicera species (including Lonicera periclymenum, Lonicera xylosteum and Lonicera caprifolium), but also Symphoricarpos albus.

References

External links
 Microlepidoptera.nl 
 Lepidoptera of Belgium
 UK Moths

Athrips
Moths described in 1758
Taxa named by Carl Linnaeus
Moths of Europe
Moths of Asia
Moths of North America